Around the time that the Pentium III processor was introduced, Intel's Xeon line diverged from its line of desktop processors, which at the time was using the Pentium branding.

The divergence was implemented by using different sockets; since then, the sockets for Xeon chips have tended to remain constant across several generations of implementation.

The chipsets contain a 'memory controller hub' and an 'I/O controller hub', which tend to be called 'north bridge' and 'south bridge' respectively. The memory controller hub connects to the processors, memory, high-speed I/O such as PCI Express, and to the I/O controller hub by a proprietary link. The I/O controller hub, on the other hand, connects to lower-speed I/O, such as SATA, PCI, USB, and Ethernet.

P6-based Xeon chipsets

Dual processor P6-based Xeon chipsets 

Intel's initial preferred chipset for Pentium III Xeon was the 840.

Four processor P6-based Xeon chipsets 

The Pentium III Xeon bus protocol allowed four processors on the same bus, so the 440GX AGPset could be used in four-CPU systems; the limit of 2GB of main memory remained. These support Slot 2.

There was also the 450NX PCIset, which consisted of several chips: a single 82451NX Memory and IO Bridge Controller roughly analogous to the North Bridge, up to two 82454NX PCI Expander Bridges which converted the protocol used by 451NX to two 32-bit PCI33 or one 64-bit PCI33 bus, along with up to two memory cards each equipped with one 82452NX RAS/CAS Generator chip and two 82453NX Data Path Multiplexer chips. It supported PIIX3 and PIIX4E south bridges, and EDO DRAM.

Eight processor P6-based Xeon chipset 

In August 1999 Intel began shipping the Profusion PCIset. The chipset was based on technology developed by the Corollary company, which Intel acquired. It supported up to 8 Pentium III Xeon processors on two busses and maintained cache coherency between them. Profusion supported up to 32 GB of memory. It saw some limited competition from the NEC Aqua II chipset. Another minor player in the eight-way space was Axil Computer's NX801, which was used in an 8-way (two buses) Pentium Pro design, commercialized by Data General as their AV-8600 computer.

NetBurst-based Xeon chipsets

Dual processor NetBurst-based Xeon chipsets 

E7500 corresponded to the first Northwood-based Pentium4 Xeons, E7501 is essentially identical but supports faster FSB and memory. The E7320, E7520 and E7525 chipsets correspond to Prescott-based Pentium4 Xeons, and differ mainly in their PCI Express support. These support Socket 604. The Intel 875P chipset was used in some two-socket motherboards for Xeons.

Note that the 82870P2 chips of E7500, E7501 and E7505 were initially designed for the Intel 870 chipset for Itanium 2, and that the summary page of the E7320 datasheet incorrectly claims three PCI Express interfaces.

Quad processor NetBurst-based Xeon chipsets 
As Intel didn't have a 4P-capable chipset for Netburst-based Xeons until 2005, for three years ServerWorks GC-HE served as the de facto standard MP chipset, even being used in Intel's own motherboards (SPSH4 and SRSH4).

Core-based Xeon chipsets

Single processor Core-based Xeon chipsets 
3000 and 3010 are an update on the E7230 chipset, codenamed Mukilteo, which has specifications very similar to the 3000 chipset. E7230 was preceded by E7221, which was Intel's first strictly single-socket server chipset.

Dual processor Core-based Xeon chipsets 

These chipsets use a 'dual independent bus' design, in which each socket has its own connection to the chipset. These use the LGA 771 socket. The datasheets omit the 667 MT/s FSB support, so 5400 may support it too.

Four processor Core-based Xeon chipsets 

This chipset uses four independent buses, and is used by the Tigerton and Dunnington processors.

Nehalem-based Xeon chipsets

Single processor Nehalem-based Xeon chipsets 

The 3450 chipset is also compatible with an Intel Core i5 or Intel Core i3 processor.

Dual processor Nehalem-based Xeon chipsets 

The Nehalem-based Xeons for dual-socket systems, initially launched as the Xeon 55xx series, feature a very different system structure: the memory controllers are on the CPU, and the CPUs can communicate with one another as peers without going via the chipset. This means that the 5500 and 5520 (initial codename Tylersburg-EP) chipsets are essentially QPI to PCI Express interfaces; the 5520 is more intended for graphical workstations and the 5500 for servers that do not need vast amounts of PCI Express connectivity

As well as the 5530

Four processor Nehalem-based Xeon chipsets

Sandy Bridge-based Xeon chipsets

Single processor Sandy Bridge-based Xeon chipsets 
The Intel C200 series chipsets that support the Intel Xeon E3-1200 CPU family.

Dual processor Sandy Bridge-based Xeon chipsets 
The Intel C600 series chipsets support the Intel Xeon E5-2600 CPU family.  Common to all C600 variants are the following features:

 DMI interface to CPU at 20 GT/s
 8 PCIe 2.0 (5 GT/s) lanes, configurable by the board manufacturer as 8×1, 4×2, 2×4, or 1×8.
 2 SATA ports supporting 6/3/1.5 gigabaud operation
 4 SATA ports supporting 3/1.5 gigabaud operation
 one PCI 2.3 32-bit 33 MHz bus interface
 14 USB 2.0 ports
 single-port Gigabit Ethernet controller
 Active Management Technology 7.0 and Anti-Theft Technology
 HD Audio controller

Some chipset variants have additional mass storage interfaces:

Dual processor Gladden/Sandy Bridge-EP/EN-based Xeon chipsets 
The Intel Communications 8900 series chipsets that support the Gladden Intel Xeon E3-11xx or Sandy Bridge-EP/EN Intel Xeon E5-2xxx CPU families.

Ivy Bridge-based Xeon chipsets

Single processor Ivy Bridge-based Xeon chipsets 
The Intel C200 series chipsets that support the Intel Xeon E3-1200v2 CPU family.

Haswell-based Xeon chipsets

Single processor Haswell-based Xeon chipsets 
The Intel C220 series chipsets support the Intel Xeon E3-1200v3 CPU family.

Multi processor Haswell-based Xeon chipsets

Skylake-based Xeon chipsets

Single processor Skylake-based Xeon chipsets 
The Intel C230 series chipsets support the Intel Xeon E3-1200v5 CPU family.

Both, the C232 and the C236 support the LGA 1151 socket.

Multi processor Skylake-based Xeon chipsets

Kaby Lake-based Xeon chipsets

Single processor Kaby Lake-based Xeon chipsets

Coffee Lake-based Xeon chipsets 

The Intel C246 series chipsets support the Intel Xeon E-2100 series of CPUs.

Cascade Lake-based Xeon chipsets

Comet Lake-based Xeon chipsets

See also
 List of Intel chipsets
 List of Intel microprocessors
 List of Intel Xeon microprocessors

References 

 dataset for the 450NX chipset
 datasheet for the E7500 MCH
 is the datasheet for the E7501 MCH
 datasheet for the 5000X MCH
 datasheet for the 5000P, 5000V and 5000Z MCH
 datasheet for the 5400 MCH
 datasheet for the 5500 and 5520 chipsets

Xeon